SP110 nuclear body protein is a protein that in humans is encoded by the SP110 gene.

The nuclear body is a multiprotein complex that may have a role in the regulation of gene transcription. This gene is a member of the SP100/SP140 family of nuclear body proteins and encodes a leukocyte-specific nuclear body component. The protein can function as an activator of gene transcription and may serve as a nuclear hormone receptor coactivator. In addition, it has been suggested that the protein may play a role in ribosome biogenesis and in the induction of myeloid cell differentiation. Alternative splicing has been observed for this gene and three transcript variants, encoding distinct isoforms, have been identified.

References

External links
 GeneReviews/NCBI/NIH/UW entry on Hepatic Veno-Occlusive Disease with Immunodeficiency

Further reading